Alen Hujić (born 11 May 1967) is a prominent Bosnian lawyer who served as the 36th president of the assembly of Bosnian football club FK Sarajevo from 27 February 2013 until 18 January 2014.  He is currently a member of the club's Board of Directors.

References

1959 births
Living people
People from Sarajevo
Bosniaks of Bosnia and Herzegovina
FK Sarajevo presidents of the assembly